The British Women's Matchplay was a women's professional golf tournament on the Ladies European Tour.

The tournament was initially held in England between 1979 and 1987. In 1988 the tournament moved to Spain, and the final installment in 1991 was held near Milan, Italy. 

Home player Mickey Walker won the tournament twice.

Winners

Source:

See also
British PGA Matchplay Championship

References

External links
Ladies European Tour

Former Ladies European Tour events
Golf tournaments in England
Golf tournaments in Spain
Golf tournaments in Italy